Philip of Taranto may refer to:
Philip I, Prince of Taranto (died 1331)
Philip, Despot of Romania (died 1331)
Philip II, Prince of Taranto (died 1374)